Strigulia is a genus of beetles in the family Buprestidae, containing the following species:

 Strigulia asmarica Bellamy, 1986
 Strigulia auberti Thery, 1930
 Strigulia boettcheri Thery, 1930
 Strigulia camerunica Obenberger, 1922
 Strigulia coerulea Kerremans, 1903
 Strigulia cyclodera (Fairmaire, 1891)
 Strigulia falcipes (Roth, 1851)
 Strigulia monardi Thery, 1947
 Strigulia nana Obenberger, 1924
 Strigulia nigritorum Kerremans, 1914
 Strigulia paradisea Obenberger, 1922
 Strigulia pygmaea Kerremans, 1899
 Strigulia scotti Thery, 1937

References

Buprestidae genera